North Berwick Law, sometimes abbreviated to Berwick Law, is a conical hill which rises conspicuously from the surrounding landscape (this is the definition of the Lowland Scots word "law"). It overlooks the East Lothian town of North Berwick, Scotland, and stands at 613 ft (187 m) above sea level.

It is considerably steeper (1:1 gradient) on its north side.

Geology 
Geologically, the law is a volcanic plug of hard phonolitic trachyte rock of Carboniferous (Dinantian) age. It has survived the scraping glaciers of the ice age. It is a crag and tail with a prominent tail extending eastwards.

History 
The summit bears remnants of an Iron Age hill fort, and the ruins of later military buildings that were once used by lookouts in both the Napoleonic Wars, and in World War II.

Since 1709 the law has been topped with a whale's jawbone. The bone was replaced three times until being removed, due to safety concerns, in 2005. On 26 June 2008, a fibreglass replica whale bone, the same size as the one that was removed in 2005, was airlifted into place to give North Berwick Law back its landmark. The funding for the replica was donated by an anonymous friend of North Berwick.

Access to the summit 
The summit of the hill can be reached by a foothpath starting from a car park located at the foot of the law. The round trip takes about one hour's walk. In order to reduce soil erosion it's warmly recommended to hikers not to leave the established path. The hill top, in clear weather, offers views of the Firth of Forth and of the nearby Bass Rock island.

See also
 Breast shaped hills
 List of inselbergs
 List of mountains in Scotland

Gallery

References

External links

 Computer-generated virtual panoramas North Berwick Law
 Stuart McHardy, The Goddess in the Landscape of Scotland

Marilyns of Scotland
Hills of the Scottish Midland Valley
Sites of Special Scientific Interest in Mid and East Lothian
Mountains and hills of East Lothian
Volcanic plugs of Scotland
Tourist attractions in East Lothian
North Berwick